Main page: List of Canadian plants by family

Families:
A | B | C | D | E | F | G | H | I J K | L | M | N | O | P Q | R | S | T | U V W | X Y Z

Acanthaceae 

 Justicia americana — common water-willow

Aceraceae 

 Acer circinatum — vine maple
 Acer glabrum — Douglas maple
 Acer macrophyllum — bigleaf maple
 Acer negundo — box-elder
 Acer nigrum — black maple
 Acer pensylvanicum — striped maple
 Acer rubrum — red maple
 Acer saccharinum — silver maple
 Acer saccharum — sugar maple
 Acer spicatum — mountain maple
 Acer × freemanii — Freeman's maple

Acoraceae 

 Acorus americanus — sweetflag

Adelanthaceae 

 Odontoschisma denudatum
 Odontoschisma elongatum
 Odontoschisma gibbsiae
 Odontoschisma macounii
 Odontoschisma sphagni

Adoxaceae 

 Adoxa moschatellina — muskroot
 Viburnum acerifolium — mapleleaf viburnum
 Viburnum edule — squashberry
 Viburnum lantanoides — alderleaf viburnum
 Viburnum lentago — nannyberry
 Viburnum nudum — possum-haw viburnum
 Viburnum opulus — guelder-rose viburnum
 Viburnum rafinesquianum — downy arrowwood
 Viburnum recognitum — northern arrowwood

Agavaceae 

 Yucca filamentosa — common yucca
 Yucca glauca — small soapweed yucca

Alismataceae 

 Alisma gramineum — narrowleaf water-plantain
 Alisma subcordatum — broad-leaved water-plantain
 Alisma triviale — northern water-plantain
 Sagittaria brevirostra — short-beaked arrowhead
 Sagittaria calycina — longlobe arrowhead
 Sagittaria cristata — crested arrowhead
 Sagittaria cuneata — Wapatum arrowhead
 Sagittaria graminea — grassleaf arrowhead
 Sagittaria latifolia — broadleaf arrowhead
 Sagittaria rigida — sessile-fruit arrowhead

Amaranthaceae 

 Amaranthus albus — white pigweed
 Amaranthus californicus — California amaranth
 Amaranthus powellii — green amaranth
 Amaranthus rudis — tall amaranth
 Amaranthus tuberculatus — roughfruit amaranth

Amblystegiaceae 

 Amblystegium serpens — amblystegium moss
 Amblystegium varium
 Calliergon cordifolium — calliergon moss
 Calliergon giganteum — giant calliergon moss
 Calliergon megalophyllum
 Calliergon obtusifolium
 Calliergon orbicularicordatum
 Calliergon richardsonii
 Calliergon stramineum
 Calliergon trifarium
 Calliergonella cuspidata
 Campylium cardotii
 Campylium chrysophyllum
 Campylium halleri
 Campylium hispidulum
 Campylium polygamum — campylium moss
 Campylium radicale
 Campylium stellatum — yellow starry fen moss
 Conardia compacta
 Cratoneuron filicinum
 Drepanocladus aduncus — drepanocladus moss
 Drepanocladus brevifolius
 Drepanocladus capillifolius
 Drepanocladus crassicostatus
 Drepanocladus sendtneri
 Hamatocaulis lapponicus
 Hamatocaulis vernicosus
 Hygroamblystegium fluviatile
 Hygroamblystegium noterophilum
 Hygroamblystegium tenax
 Hygrohypnum alpestre
 Hygrohypnum alpinum
 Hygrohypnum bestii
 Hygrohypnum cochlearifolium
 Hygrohypnum duriusculum
 Hygrohypnum eugyrium
 Hygrohypnum luridum
 Hygrohypnum micans
 Hygrohypnum molle
 Hygrohypnum montanum
 Hygrohypnum norvegicum
 Hygrohypnum ochraceum
 Hygrohypnum polare
 Hygrohypnum smithii
 Hygrohypnum styriacum
 Hygrohypnum subeugyrium
 Leptodictyum humile
 Leptodictyum riparium
 Limprichtia cossonii
 Limprichtia revolvens — limprichtia moss
 Loeskypnum badium
 Loeskypnum wickesiae
 Palustriella commutata
 Palustriella decipiens
 Platylomella lescurii
 Pseudocalliergon turgescens
 Sanionia uncinata
 Sarmenthypnum sarmentosum
 Scorpidium scorpioides
 Warnstorfia exannulata — warnstorfia moss
 Warnstorfia fluitans — warnstorfia moss
 Warnstorfia procera
 Warnstorfia pseudostraminea
 Warnstorfia trichophylla
 Warnstorfia tundrae

Anacardiaceae 

 Rhus aromatica — fragrant sumac
 Rhus copallinum — winged sumac
 Rhus glabra — smooth sumac
 Rhus trilobata — skunkbush
 Rhus typhina — staghorn sumac
 Rhus × pulvinata
 Toxicodendron diversilobum — western poison-oak
 Toxicodendron radicans — eastern poison-ivy
 Toxicodendron rydbergii — northern poison-oak
 Toxicodendron vernix — poison-sumac

Andreaeaceae 

 Andreaea alpestris
 Andreaea blyttii
 Andreaea crassinervia
 Andreaea heinemannii
 Andreaea megistospora
 Andreaea mutabilis
 Andreaea nivalis
 Andreaea obovata
 Andreaea rothii
 Andreaea rupestris
 Andreaea schofieldiana
 Andreaea sinuosa

Andreaeobryaceae 

 Andreaeobryum macrosporum

Aneuraceae 

 Aneura pinguis
 Riccardia chamedryfolia
 Riccardia latifrons
 Riccardia multifida — comb liverwort
 Riccardia palmata

Annonaceae 

 Asimina triloba — pawpaw

Anomodontaceae 

 Anomodon attenuatus
 Anomodon minor
 Anomodon rostratus
 Anomodon rugelii
 Anomodon viticulosus
 Haplohymenium triste
 Pterogonium gracile

Antheliaceae 

 Anthelia julacea
 Anthelia juratzkana

Anthocerotaceae 

 Anthoceros agrestis
 Anthoceros fusiformis
 Anthoceros macounii

Apiaceae 

 Angelica archangelica — Norwegian angelica
 Angelica arguta — Lyall's angelica
 Angelica atropurpurea — great angelica
 Angelica dawsonii — Dawson's angelica
 Angelica genuflexa — kneeling angelica
 Angelica laurentiana — St. Lawrence angelica
 Angelica lucida — seacoast angelica
 Angelica venenosa — hairy angelica
 Berula erecta — wild parsnip
 Bupleurum americanum — American thorowax
 Chaerophyllum procumbens — spreading chervil
 Chaerophyllum tainturieri — Tainturier's chervil
 Cicuta bulbifera — bulb-bearing water-hemlock
 Cicuta douglasii — western water-hemlock
 Cicuta maculata — spotted water-hemlock
 Cicuta virosa — MacKenzie's water-hemlock
 Cnidium cnidiifolium — Jakutsk snow parsley
 Conioselinum chinense — Chinese hemlock-parsley
 Conioselinum gmelinii — western hemlock-parsley
 Cryptotaenia canadensis — Canada honewort
 Cymopterus acaulis — plains wavewing
 Daucus pusillus — southwestern carrot
 Erigenia bulbosa — harbinger-of-spring
 Glehnia littoralis — American glehnia
 Heracleum maximum — cow-parsnip
 Hydrocotyle americana — American water-pennywort
 Hydrocotyle umbellata — many-flowered pennywort
 Hydrocotyle verticillata — whorled pennywort
 Ligusticum calderi — Calder's lovage
 Ligusticum canbyi — Canby's wild lovage
 Ligusticum scoticum — Scotch lovage
 Ligusticum verticillatum — Idaho lovage
 Lilaeopsis chinensis — eastern lilæopsis
 Lilaeopsis occidentalis — western lilæopsis
 Lomatium ambiguum — streambank desert-parsley
 Lomatium brandegeei — Brandegee's desert-parsley
 Lomatium cous — cousroot desert-parsley
 Lomatium dissectum — fernleaf desert-parsley
 Lomatium foeniculaceum — carrotleaf desert-parsley
 Lomatium geyeri — Geyer's desert-parsley
 Lomatium grayi — mountain desert-parsley
 Lomatium macrocarpum — largefruit desert-parsley
 Lomatium martindalei — coast range lomatium
 Lomatium nudicaule — nakedstem desert-parsley
 Lomatium orientale — Oriental desert-parsley
 Lomatium sandbergii — Sandberg's desert-parsley
 Lomatium simplex — umbrella desert-parsley
 Lomatium triternatum — ternate desert-parsley
 Lomatium utriculatum — foothill desert-parsley
 Musineon divaricatum — wild parsley
 Oenanthe sarmentosa — water-parsley
 Osmorhiza berteroi — Chilean sweet-cicely
 Osmorhiza claytonii — hairy sweet-cicely
 Osmorhiza depauperata — bluntfruit sweet-cicely
 Osmorhiza longistylis — smoother sweet-cicely
 Osmorhiza occidentalis — western sweet-cicely
 Osmorhiza purpurea — purple sweet-cicely
 Oxypolis occidentalis — western cowbane
 Oxypolis rigidior — stiff cowbane
 Perideridia gairdneri — Gairdner's yampah
 Podistera macounii — Macoun's podistera
 Podistera yukonensis — Yukon podistera
 Sanicula arctopoides — bear's-foot sanicle
 Sanicula bipinnatifida — purple black snakeroot
 Sanicula canadensis — short-styled sanicle
 Sanicula crassicaulis — Pacific black snakeroot
 Sanicula graveolens — sierra sanicle
 Sanicula marilandica — Maryland black snakeroot
 Sanicula odorata — clustered black snakeroot
 Sanicula trifoliata — large-fruited sanicle
 Sium suave — hemlock water-parsnip
 Taenidia integerrima — yellow pimpernel
 Thaspium barbinode — hairyjoint meadow-parsnip
 Thaspium trifoliatum — purple meadow-parsnip
 Yabea microcarpa — California hedge-parsley
 Zizia aptera — golden alexanders
 Zizia aurea — common alexanders

Apocynaceae 

 Apocynum androsaemifolium — spreading dogbane
 Apocynum cannabinum — clasping-leaf dogbane
 Apocynum × floribundum — hybrid dogbane

Aquifoliaceae 

 Ilex glabra — ink-berry
 Ilex verticillata — black holly
 Nemopanthus mucronatus — mountain holly

Araceae 

 Arisaema dracontium — green dragon
 Arisaema triphyllum — swamp Jack-in-the-pulpit
 Calla palustris — wild calla
 Lysichiton americanus — yellow skunk-cabbage
 Peltandra virginica — green arrow-arum
 Symplocarpus foetidus — skunk-cabbage

Araliaceae 

 Aralia hispida — bristly sarsaparilla
 Aralia nudicaulis — wild sarsaparilla
 Aralia racemosa — American spikenard
 Oplopanax horridus — Devil's-club
 Panax quinquefolius — American ginseng
 Panax trifolius — dwarf ginseng

Archidiaceae 

 Archidium ohioense

Aristolochiaceae 

 Asarum canadense — Canada wild-ginger
 Asarum caudatum — long-tailed wild-ginger

Arnelliaceae 

 Arnellia fennica

Asclepiadaceae 

 Asclepias exaltata — poke milkweed
 Asclepias hirtella — green milkweed
 Asclepias incarnata — swamp milkweed
 Asclepias lanuginosa — woolly milkweed
 Asclepias ovalifolia — dwarf milkweed
 Asclepias purpurascens — purple milkweed
 Asclepias quadrifolia — whorled milkweed
 Asclepias speciosa — showy milkweed
 Asclepias sullivantii — prairie milkweed
 Asclepias syriaca — Kansas milkweed
 Asclepias tuberosa — butterfly milkweed
 Asclepias verticillata — whorled milkweed
 Asclepias viridiflora — green milkweed

Aspleniaceae 

 Asplenium adulterinum — ladder spleenwort
 Asplenium platyneuron — ebony spleenwort
 Asplenium rhizophyllum — walking-fern spleenwort
 Asplenium ruta-muraria — wallrue spleenwort
 Asplenium scolopendrium — hart's-tongue fern
 Asplenium trichomanes — maidenhair spleenwort
 Asplenium viride — green spleenwort

Asteraceae 

 Achillea millefolium — common yarrow
 Achillea sibirica — Siberian yarrow
 Adenocaulon bicolor — American trail-plant
 Ageratina altissima — white snakeroot
 Agoseris aurantiaca — orange-flowered false-dandelion
 Agoseris gaspensis — Gaspé Peninsula agoseris
 Agoseris glauca — pale goat-chicory
 Agoseris grandiflora — largeflower false-dandelion
 Agoseris heterophylla — annual false-dandelion
 Agoseris lackschewitzii — pink agoseris
 Almutaster pauciflorus — marsh alkali aster
 Ambrosia acanthicarpa — flatspine bursage
 Ambrosia artemisiifolia — annual ragweed
 Ambrosia chamissonis — silver bursage
 Ambrosia coronopifolia — western ragweed
 Ambrosia psilostachya — nakedspike ambrosia
 Ambrosia trifida — great ragweed
 Ambrosia × helenae
 Anaphalis margaritacea — pearly everlasting
 Antennaria alpina — alpine pussytoes
 Antennaria anaphaloides — handsome pussytoes
 Antennaria aromatica — aromatic pussytoes
 Antennaria corymbosa — meadow pussytoes
 Antennaria densifolia — dense-leaved antennaria
 Antennaria dimorpha — two-form pussytoes
 Antennaria eucosma — Newfoundland pussytoes
 Antennaria flagellaris — stoloniferous pussytoes
 Antennaria friesiana — Fries' pussytoes
 Antennaria howellii — small pussytoes
 Antennaria lanata — white-margined pussytoes
 Antennaria luzuloides — silvery-brown pussytoes
 Antennaria media — Stony Mountain pussytoes
 Antennaria microphylla — small-leaf cat's-foot
 Antennaria monocephala — single-head pussytoes
 Antennaria neglecta — field pussytoes
 Antennaria parlinii — Parlin's pussytoes
 Antennaria parvifolia — Nuttall's pussytoes
 Antennaria plantaginifolia — plantainleaf pussytoes
 Antennaria pulcherrima — handsome pussytoes
 Antennaria racemosa — Hooker's pussytoes
 Antennaria rosea — rosy pussytoes
 Antennaria stenophylla — narrowleaf pussytoes
 Antennaria umbrinella — brown pussytoes
 Antennaria × erigeroides
 Antennaria × macounii
 Antennaria × rousseaui
 Arnica amplexicaulis — streambank arnica
 Arnica angustifolia — narrowleaf leopardbane
 Arnica chamissonis — leafy arnica
 Arnica cordifolia — heart-leaved arnica
 Arnica frigida — snow leopardbane
 Arnica fulgens — hillside arnica
 Arnica gracilis — slender leopardbane
 Arnica lanceolata
 Arnica latifolia — mountain arnica
 Arnica lessingii — Lessing's arnica
 Arnica lonchophylla — northern arnica
 Arnica longifolia — longleaf arnica
 Arnica louiseana — Lake Louise arnica
 Arnica mollis — hairy arnica
 Arnica parryi — nodding arnica
 Arnica rydbergii — subalpine arnica
 Arnica sororia — twin arnica
 Arnica × diversifolia — rayless arnica
 Arnoglossum plantagineum — Indian-plantain
 Artemisia alaskana — Alaska wormwood
 Artemisia arctica — boreal sagebrush
 Artemisia biennis — biennial wormwood
 Artemisia campestris — Pacific wormwood
 Artemisia cana — hoary sagebrush
 Artemisia dracunculus — dragon wormwood
 Artemisia frigida — prairie sagebrush
 Artemisia furcata — three-fork wormwood
 Artemisia globularia — arctic wormwood
 Artemisia glomerata — Pacific alpine wormwood
 Artemisia laciniata — Siberian wormwood
 Artemisia lindleyana — Columbia River wormwood
 Artemisia longifolia — longleaf wormwood
 Artemisia ludoviciana — white sagebrush
 Artemisia michauxiana — Michaux's wormwood
 Artemisia rupestris — rock wormwood
 Artemisia suksdorfii — coastal wormwood
 Artemisia tilesii — Tilesius' wormwood
 Artemisia tridentata — big sagebrush
 Artemisia tripartita — three-tip sagebrush
 Aster alpinus — alpine aster
 Baccharis halimifolia — eastern baccharis
 Balsamorhiza deltoidea — deltoid balsamroot
 Balsamorhiza sagittata — arrowleaf balsamroot
 Bidens amplissima — Vancouver Island beggarticks
 Bidens cernua — nodding beggarticks
 Bidens connata — purplestem beggarticks
 Bidens coronata — tickseed sunflower
 Bidens discoidea — swamp beggarticks
 Bidens eatonii — Eaton's beggarticks
 Bidens frondosa — Devil's beggarticks
 Bidens heterodoxa — Connecticut beggarticks
 Bidens hyperborea — estuary beggarticks
 Bidens tripartita — three-lobe beggarticks
 Bidens vulgata — tall bur-marigold
 Boltonia asteroides — aster-like boltonia
 Brickellia grandiflora — tassel flower
 Brickellia oblongifolia — narrowleaf brickell-bush
 Cacaliopsis nardosmia — silvercrown
 Canadanthus modestus — great northern aster
 Chaenactis douglasii — hoary pincushion
 Chrysothamnus viscidiflorus — sticky-leaf rabbitbrush
 Cirsium brevistylum — shortstyle thistle
 Cirsium canescens — prairie thistle
 Cirsium discolor — field thistle
 Cirsium drummondii — Drummond's thistle
 Cirsium edule — edible thistle
 Cirsium flodmanii — Flodman's thistle
 Cirsium foliosum — leafy thistle
 Cirsium hillii — Hill's thistle
 Cirsium hookerianum — Hooker's thistle
 Cirsium muticum — swamp thistle
 Cirsium pitcheri — dune thistle
 Cirsium scariosum
 Cirsium undulatum — nodding thistle
 Cirsium × vancouverense
 Conyza canadensis — Canada horseweed
 Coreopsis lanceolata — sand coreopsis
 Coreopsis rosea — rose coreopsis
 Coreopsis tinctoria — golden tickseed
 Coreopsis tripteris — tall tickseed
 Crepis atribarba — slender hawk's-beard
 Crepis elegans — elegant hawk's-beard
 Crepis intermedia — smallflower hawk's-beard
 Crepis modocensis — Siskiyou hawk's-beard
 Crepis nana — dwarf alpine hawk's-beard
 Crepis occidentalis — grey hawk's-beard
 Crepis runcinata — nakedstem hawk's-beard
 Crocidium multicaule — common spring-gold
 Dendranthema arcticum — arctic daisy
 Doellingeria umbellata — flat-top white aster
 Echinacea angustifolia — narrow-leaved purple coneflower
 Echinacea pallida — pale purple coneflower
 Eclipta prostrata — false daisy
 Erechtites hieraciifolia — fireweed
 Ericameria nauseosa — rubber rabbitbrush
 Erigeron acris — bitter fleabane
 Erigeron alpiniformis — alpine fleabane
 Erigeron annuus — whitetop fleabane
 Erigeron asper — rough fleabane
 Erigeron aureus — alpine yellow fleabane
 Erigeron borealis — boreal fleabane
 Erigeron caespitosus — cæspitose fleabane
 Erigeron compositus — dwarf mountain fleabane
 Erigeron corymbosus — longleaf fleabane
 Erigeron divergens — spreading fleabane
 Erigeron elatus — tall bitter fleabane
 Erigeron evermannii — Evermann's fleabane
 Erigeron filifolius — threadleaf fleabane
 Erigeron flagellaris — running fleabane
 Erigeron formosissimus — beautiful fleabane
 Erigeron glabellus — smooth fleabane
 Erigeron grandiflorus — largeflower fleabane
 Erigeron humilis — low fleabane
 Erigeron hyperboreus — hyperboreal fleabane
 Erigeron hyssopifolius — daisy fleabane
 Erigeron lackschewitzii — front range fleabane
 Erigeron lanatus — woolly fleabane
 Erigeron leibergii — Leiberg's fleabane
 Erigeron linearis — linearleaf fleabane
 Erigeron lonchophyllus — short-ray fleabane
 Erigeron mexiae — Mex' fleabane
 Erigeron ochroleucus — buff fleabane
 Erigeron pallens — pale fleabane
 Erigeron peregrinus — foreign fleabane
 Erigeron philadelphicus — Philadelphia fleabane
 Erigeron poliospermus — hairyseed fleabane
 Erigeron pulchellus — robin's-plantain
 Erigeron pumilus — shaggy fleabane
 Erigeron purpuratus — purple fleabane
 Erigeron radicatus — tap-rooted fleabane
 Erigeron salishii — Salish's daisy
 Erigeron scotteri — Scotter's fleabane
 Erigeron speciosus — Aspen fleabane
 Erigeron strigosus — daisy fleabane
 Erigeron subtrinervis — three-nerve fleabane
 Erigeron uniflorus — one-flower fleabane
 Erigeron × arthurii
 Erigeron yukonensis — Yukon fleabane
 Eriophyllum lanatum — common woolly-sunflower
 Eucephalus engelmannii — Engelmann's aster
 Eucephalus paucicapitatus — olympic aster
 Eupatorium altissimum — tall boneset
 Eupatorium dubium — joe-pye thoroughwort
 Eupatorium fistulosum — hollow joe-pyeweed
 Eupatorium maculatum — spotted joe-pyeweed
 Eupatorium perfoliatum — common boneset
 Eupatorium purpureum — sweet joe-pyeweed
 Eupatorium × truncatum
 Eurybia conspicua — showy aster
 Eurybia divaricata — white wood-aster
 Eurybia macrophylla — largeleaf wood-aster
 Eurybia merita — arctic aster
 Eurybia pygmaea — pygmy wood-aster
 Eurybia radula — rough wood-aster
 Eurybia radulina — roughleaf aster
 Eurybia schreberi — Schreiber's aster
 Eurybia sibirica — Siberian aster
 Euthamia caroliniana — slender fragrant goldenrod
 Euthamia galetorum — narrowleaf fragrant goldenrod
 Euthamia graminifolia — flat-top fragrant goldenrod
 Euthamia gymnospermoides — viscid bushy goldenrod
 Euthamia occidentalis — western fragrant goldenrod
 Gaillardia aristata — great blanket-flower
 Gaillardia pulchella — firewheel blanket-flower
 Gamochaeta ustulata — featherweed
 Gnaphalium obtusifolium — fragrant cudweed
 Gnaphalium palustre — western marsh cudweed
 Gnaphalium viscosum — winged cudweed
 Grindelia hirsutula — hairy gumweed
 Grindelia integrifolia — Puget Sound gumweed
 Grindelia nana — Idaho gumweed
 Grindelia nuda — curly-top gumweed
 Grindelia squarrosa — broadleaf gumweed
 Grindelia stricta — Oregon gumweed
 Gutierrezia sarothrae — broom snakeweed
 Helenium autumnale — common sneezeweed
 Helianthella uniflora — Rocky Mountain rockrose
 Helianthus annuus — common sunflower
 Helianthus couplandii — Coupland's sunflower
 Helianthus decapetalus — thin-leaved sunflower
 Helianthus divaricatus — woodland sunflower
 Helianthus giganteus — tall sunflower
 Helianthus maximiliani — Maximillian's sunflower
 Helianthus nuttallii — Nuttall's sunflower
 Helianthus pauciflorus — stiff sunflower
 Helianthus petiolaris — prairie sunflower
 Helianthus strumosus — paleleaf sunflower
 Helianthus tuberosus — Jerusalem artichoke
 Helianthus × alexidis
 Helianthus × laetiflorus — hybrid prairie sunflower
 Helianthus × luxurians
 Heliopsis helianthoides — smooth oxeye
 Heterotheca villosa — hairy false goldenaster
 Hieracium albiflorum — whiteflower hawkweed
 Hieracium canadense — Canada hawkweed
 Hieracium cynoglossoides — hound's-tongue hawkweed
 Hieracium gracile — alpine hawkweed
 Hieracium groenlandicum — Greenland hawkweed
 Hieracium gronovii — hairy hawkweed
 Hieracium kalmii — Kalm's hawkweed
 Hieracium laevigatum — smooth hawkweed
 Hieracium marianum — Maryland hawkweed
 Hieracium paniculatum — panicled hawkweed
 Hieracium plicatum — boreal hawkweed
 Hieracium robinsonii — Robinson's hawkweed
 Hieracium scabrum — rough hawkweed
 Hieracium scouleri — Scouler's hawkweed
 Hieracium triste — woolly hawkweed
 Hieracium umbellatum — umbellate hawkweed
 Hieracium venosum — rattlesnake hawkweed
 Hieracium × dutillyanum
 Hieracium × fassettii
 Hieracium × fernaldii
 Hieracium × flagellare
 Hieracium × grohii
 Hieracium × stoloniflorum
 Hymenopappus filifolius — fineleaf woolly-white
 Hymenoxys richardsonii — Richardson's bitterweed
 Ionactis linariifolius — flaxleaf aster
 Ionactis stenomeres — Rocky Mountain aster
 Iva axillaris — small-flowered marsh-elder
 Iva frutescens — bigleaf marsh-elder
 Jaumea carnosa — fleshy jaumea
 Krigia biflora — two-flower dwarf-dandelion
 Krigia virginica — Virginia dwarf-dandelion
 Lactuca biennis — tall blue lettuce
 Lactuca canadensis — Canada lettuce
 Lactuca floridana — woodland lettuce
 Lactuca hirsuta — hairy lettuce
 Lactuca ludoviciana — western lettuce
 Lactuca tatarica — Tartarian lettuce
 Lactuca terrae-novae — Newfoundland lettuce
 Lasthenia maritima — maritime goldfields
 Leucanthemum integrifolium — entire-leaf daisy
 Liatris aspera — tall gayfeather
 Liatris cylindracea — slender blazingstar
 Liatris ligulistylis — strapstyle gayfeather
 Liatris punctata — dotted gayfeather
 Liatris spheroidea — spherical gayfeather
 Liatris spicata — marsh blazingstar
 Liatris × creditonensis
 Liatris × gladewitzii
 Luina hypoleuca — littleleaf silverback
 Lygodesmia juncea — rush skeletonplant
 Machaeranthera canescens — hoary tansy-aster
 Machaeranthera grindelioides — western aster
 Machaeranthera pinnatifida — spiny goldenaster
 Madia exigua — little tarweed
 Madia glomerata — mountain tarweed
 Madia gracilis — grassy tarweed
 Madia madioides — woodland tarweed
 Madia minima — smallhead tarweed
 Matricaria discoidea — pineapple-weed chamomile
 Megalodonta beckii — Beck's water-marigold
 Microseris bigelovii — coast microseris
 Microseris borealis — northern microseris
 Microseris lindleyi — Lindley's silverpuffs
 Microseris nutans — nodding silverpuffs
 Mikania scandens — climbing hempweed
 Nothocalais cuspidata — prairie false-dandelion
 Nothocalais troximoides — weevil false-dandelion
 Oclemena acuminata — whorled aster
 Oclemena nemoralis — bog aster
 Oclemena × blakei — Blake's aster
 Oligoneuron album — prairie goldenrod
 Oligoneuron houghtonii — Houghton's goldenrod
 Oligoneuron ohioense — Ohio goldenrod
 Oligoneuron riddellii — Riddell's goldenrod
 Oligoneuron rigidum — stiff goldenrod
 Oligoneuron × bernardii
 Oligoneuron × krotkovii
 Oligoneuron × lutescens — upland aster
 Oligoneuron × maheuxii
 Omalotheca norvegica — Norwegian cudweed
 Omalotheca supina — alpine cudweed
 Omalotheca sylvatica — woodland cudweed
 Packera aurea — golden ragwort
 Packera cana — silvery ragwort
 Packera contermina — northwestern groundsel
 Packera cymbalaria — dwarf arctic groundsel
 Packera hyperborealis — boreal groundsel
 Packera indecora — plains ragwort
 Packera macounii — Siskiyou Mountains butterweed
 Packera moresbiensis — Queen Charlotte groundsel
 Packera obovata — roundleaf groundsel
 Packera ogotorukensis — Ogotoruk Creek groundsel
 Packera pauciflora — few-flower ragwort
 Packera paupercula — balsam ragwort
 Packera plattensis — prairie ragwort
 Packera pseudaurea — western golden groundsel
 Packera schweinitziana — Robbin's squawweed
 Packera streptanthifolia — cleftleaf ragwort
 Packera tridenticulata — three-tooth groundsel
 Petasites frigidus — arctic butterbur
 Petasites sagittatus — arrowleaf sweet colt's-foot
 Petasites × vitifolius
 Picradeniopsis oppositifolia — oppositeleaf false bahia
 Polymnia canadensis — whiteflower leafcup
 Prenanthes alata — western rattlesnake-root
 Prenanthes alba — white rattlesnake-root
 Prenanthes altissima — tall rattlesnake-root
 Prenanthes nana — dwarf rattlesnake-root
 Prenanthes racemosa — glaucous rattlesnake-root
 Prenanthes sagittata — arrowleaf rattlesnake-root
 Prenanthes trifoliolata — three-leaved rattlesnake-root
 Prenanthes × mainensis
 Pseudognaphalium canescens — Wright's cudweed
 Psilocarphus brevissimus — round woolly-heads
 Psilocarphus elatior — tall woolly-heads
 Psilocarphus tenellus — slender woolly-heads
 Pyrrocoma carthamoides — largeflower goldenweed
 Pyrrocoma lanceolata — lance-leaved goldenweed
 Pyrrocoma uniflora — plantain goldenweed
 Ratibida columnifera — upright prairie coneflower
 Ratibida pinnata — greyhead prairie coneflower
 Rudbeckia fulgida — orange coneflower
 Rudbeckia hirta — black-eyed susan
 Rudbeckia laciniata — cut-leaved coneflower
 Saussurea americana — American saw-wort
 Saussurea angustifolia — narrowleaf saw-wort
 Saussurea densa — clustered saw-wort
 Saussurea viscida — sticky saw-wort
 Senecio congestus — marsh ragwort
 Senecio cymbalarioides — cleftleaf groundsel
 Senecio elmeri — Elmer's ragwort
 Senecio eremophilus — desert groundsel
 Senecio fremontii — Fremont's ragwort
 Senecio hydrophiloides — sweet marsh ragwort
 Senecio hydrophilus — great swamp ragwort
 Senecio integerrimus — entire-leaf ragwort
 Senecio lugens — blacktip groundsel
 Senecio megacephalus — Nuttall's ragwort
 Senecio pseudoarnica — seabeach groundsel
 Senecio sheldonensis — Mount Sheldon groundsel
 Senecio triangularis — arrowleaf groundsel
 Sericocarpus rigidus — Curtus' aster
 Shinnersoseris rostrata — annual skeletonweed
 Silphium laciniatum — compass plant
 Silphium perfoliatum — cup-plant
 Silphium terebinthinaceum — prairie rosinweed
 Sinosenecio newcombei — Newcombe's groundsel
 Solidago altissima — tall goldenrod
 Solidago arguta — cutleaf goldenrod
 Solidago bicolor — white goldenrod
 Solidago caesia — bluestem goldenrod
 Solidago calcicola — rock goldenrod
 Solidago canadensis — Canada goldenrod
 Solidago cutleri — Cutler's goldenrod
 Solidago flexicaulis — broad-leaved goldenrod
 Solidago gigantea — smooth goldenrod
 Solidago hispida — hairy goldenrod
 Solidago juncea — early goldenrod
 Solidago latissimifolia — Elliott's goldenrod
 Solidago macrophylla — largeleaf goldenrod
 Solidago missouriensis — Missouri goldenrod
 Solidago mollis — ground goldenrod
 Solidago multiradiata — alpine goldenrod
 Solidago nemoralis — field goldenrod
 Solidago patula — roundleaf goldenrod
 Solidago puberula — downy goldenrod
 Solidago rugosa — roughleaf goldenrod
 Solidago sempervirens — seaside goldenrod
 Solidago simplex — sticky goldenrod
 Solidago speciosa — showy goldenrod
 Solidago squarrosa — squarrose goldenrod
 Solidago uliginosa — bog goldenrod
 Solidago ulmifolia — elmleaf goldenrod
 Solidago victorinii — Victorin's goldenrod
 Solidago × asperula
 Solidago × beaudryi
 Solidago × erskinei
 Solidago × luteus
 Solidago × raymondii
 Stenotus acaulis — stemless mock goldenweed
 Stenotus armerioides — thrift mock goldenweed
 Stenotus macleanii — MacLean's goldenweed
 Stephanomeria minor — narrowleaf skeletonplant
 Stephanomeria runcinata — desert skeletonplant
 Stephanomeria spinosa — thorny wire-lettuce
 Symphyotrichum anticostense — Anticosti aster
 Symphyotrichum ascendens — western aster
 Symphyotrichum boreale — boreal aster
 Symphyotrichum campestre — western meadow-aster
 Symphyotrichum ciliatum — alkali American-aster
 Symphyotrichum ciliolatum — Lindley's aster
 Symphyotrichum cordifolium — heartleaf aster
 Symphyotrichum dumosum — bushy aster
 Symphyotrichum eatonii — Eaton's aster
 Symphyotrichum ericoides — white heath aster
 Symphyotrichum falcatum — white prairie aster
 Symphyotrichum foliaceum — leafy-bracted aster
 Symphyotrichum frondosum — alkali aster
 Symphyotrichum hendersonii — Henderson's American-aster
 Symphyotrichum laeve — smooth blue aster
 Symphyotrichum lanceolatum — panicled aster
 Symphyotrichum lateriflorum — starved aster
 Symphyotrichum laurentianum — St. Lawrence aster
 Symphyotrichum novae-angliae — New England aster
 Symphyotrichum novi-belgii — longleaf aster
 Symphyotrichum ontarionis — Ontario aster
 Symphyotrichum oolentangiense — sky blue aster
 Symphyotrichum pilosum — white heath aster
 Symphyotrichum praealtum — willow aster
 Symphyotrichum prenanthoides — crooked-stem aster
 Symphyotrichum puniceum — swamp aster
 Symphyotrichum racemosum — small white aster
 Symphyotrichum robynsianum — Robyns' American-aster
 Symphyotrichum sericeum — western silvery aster
 Symphyotrichum shortii — Short's aster
 Symphyotrichum spathulatum — western mountain aster
 Symphyotrichum subspicatum — Douglas' aster
 Symphyotrichum subulatum — annual saltmarsh aster
 Symphyotrichum tradescantii — Tradescant's aster
 Symphyotrichum undulatum — wavyleaf aster
 Symphyotrichum urophyllum — white-arrow aster
 Symphyotrichum × amethystinum
 Symphyotrichum yukonense — Yukon aster
 Tanacetum bipinnatum — Lake Huron tansy
 Taraxacum carneocoloratum — pink dandelion
 Taraxacum eriophorum — wool-bearing dandelion
 Taraxacum lyratum — alpine dandelion
 Taraxacum officinale — common dandelion
 Taraxacum phymatocarpum — northern dandelion
 Tephroseris atropurpurea — dark purple groundsel
 Tephroseris kjellmanii — Kjellman's squawweed
 Tephroseris lindstroemii — twice-hairy groundsel
 Tephroseris yukonensis — Yukon groundsel
 Tetradymia canescens — grey horsebrush
 Tetraneuris acaulis — stemless four-nerve daisy
 Tetraneuris herbacea — lakeside daisy
 Thelesperma subnudum — border goldthread
 Tonestus lyallii — Lyall's haplopappus
 Townsendia condensata — cushion townsend-daisy
 Townsendia exscapa — silky townsend-daisy
 Townsendia hookeri — Hooker's townsend-daisy
 Townsendia parryi — Parry's townsend-daisy
 Tripleurospermum maritima — false chamomile
 Verbesina alternifolia — wingstem
 Vernonia fasciculata — fascicled ironweed
 Vernonia gigantea — giant ironweed
 Vernonia missurica — Missouri ironweed
 Xanthium strumarium — rough cocklebur

Aulacomniaceae 

 Aulacomnium acuminatum — acutetip aulacomnium moss
 Aulacomnium androgynum
 Aulacomnium heterostichum
 Aulacomnium palustre — aulacomnium moss
 Aulacomnium turgidum

Aytoniaceae 

 Asterella gracilis
 Asterella lindenbergiana
 Asterella saccata
 Asterella tenella
 Mannia fragrans
 Mannia pilosa
 Mannia sibirica
 Mannia triandra
 Reboulia hemisphaerica

Azollaceae 

 Azolla caroliniana — eastern mosquito-fern
 Azolla mexicana — Mexican mosquito-fern